Tilda-Neora railway station is a main railway station in Raipur district, Chhattisgarh, India. Its code is TLD. It serves Tilda-Neora Urban area. The station consists of four platforms. The station lies on the Raipur–Bilaspur branch line of Bilaspur–Nagpur section.

Major trains
 Sarnath Express
 Shivnath Express
 Shalimar–Lokmanya Tilak Terminus Express
 Amarkantak Express
 Raigarh–Hazrat Nizamuddin Gondwana Express
 South Bihar Express
 Raigarh–Gondia Jan Shatabdi Express
 Chhattisgarh Express
 Betwa Express
 Bilaspur–Tirupati Express
 Nagpur–Bilaspur Intercity Express
 Howrah–Ahmedabad Superfast Express
 Durg–Nautanwa Express (via Sultanpur)
 Hasdeo Express
 Durg–Ambikapur Express
 Durg–Jammu Tawi Express
 Korba–Visakhapatnam Express
 Durg–Ajmer Express

History Of Change Name "Tilda" To "Tilda-Neora"
After Receiving the No Objection from the Home Ministry Government Of India  on the application of National & Zonal Railway Users Consultative Council Member Deepak Sharma Tilda-Neora in the year 2018 October, the Government of India and the State Government have been named "Tilda-Neora" in all the offices of the state government and Tilda railway station.
The applicant of this station name change can be confirmed by the confirmation passed by the municipality of Tilda-Neora and by the documents available in the Department of Revenue Department Chhattisgarh Government.

References

Railway stations in Raipur district
Raipur railway division